Mariama Sarr (born 4 March 1963) is a Senegalese politician. She is currently serving as Minister of Public Service and Public Service Renewal in the Fourth Sall government.

Career 
Sarr served as Minister for Women, Children and Women's Entrepreneurship from 2012 to 2013. She is also mayor of Kaolack.

References 

1963 births
Living people
Women's ministers of Senegal
Women government ministers of Senegal
21st-century Senegalese politicians
21st-century Senegalese women politicians
Women mayors of places in Senegal
Mayors of places in Senegal